Edward Henry May (26 September 1865 – 6 January 1941) was an English footballer who played for Notts Rangers, Burslem Port Vale, Notts County, and Nottingham Forest in the 1880s and 1890s.

Career
May played for Notts Rangers before joining Burslem Port Vale in the summer of 1886. He made his debut at the Athletic Ground in a 7–0 defeat to Preston North End in a friendly on 6 September. He enjoyed regular football, helping the club to the Third Round of the FA Cup in 1886–87, until March 1887 when he departed for Notts County. He returned to Burslem on business in September 1887 and decided to rejoin the Vale, playing regular football once more until he returned to Nottingham in the summer of 1888.  He scored three goals in 11 league games in the Football League in the 1888–89 season, and featured in 18 league games in the 1889–90 campaign. He went on to play in the Football Alliance for Nottingham Forest, before he joined Second Division club Burton Swifts in 1892. He scored eight goals in 24 league and cup appearances for the Swifts in the 1892–93 season, and later played for Burton Swifts, Greenhalgh's, and Mansfield.

Career statistics
Source:

References

1865 births
1941 deaths
Footballers from Kingston upon Hull
English footballers
Association football wingers
Notts Rangers F.C. players
Port Vale F.C. players
Notts County F.C. players
Nottingham Forest F.C. players
Burton Swifts F.C. players
Midland Football League players
English Football League players